Isingiro is a town in the Western Region of Uganda. It is the main municipal, administrative, and commercial center of Isingiro District and the site of the district's headquarters.

Location
The town of Isingiro is surrounded by the villages of Nyakigera, Gayaza, Rwembwa, Mabona, Kibwera, and Rumira. The coordinates of Isingiro Town Council are 0°47'42.0"S, 30°48'55.0"E (Latitude:-0.795000, Longitude:30.815278).

Population
The 2002 national population census estimated the town's population at 17,000. In 2010, the Uganda Bureau of Statistics (UBOS) estimated the population at 21,400. In 2011, UBOS estimated the mid-year population at 22,000. 

In August 2014, the national population census put the population at 27,991. In 2015, UBOS estimated the population of the town at 28,800. In 2020, the population agency estimated the mid-year population at 34,300 inhabitants. Of those, 17,500 (51 percent) were females and 16,800 (49 percent) were males. UBOS calculated that the population of Isingiro Town Council expanded at an average annual rate of 3.6 percent, between 2015 and 2020.

Points of interest
The following additional points of interest lie within the town limits or close to the edges of town: (a) the headquarters of Isingiro District administration (b) the offices of Isingiro Town Council (c) Isingiro central market, the source of daily fresh produce and (d) the  Mbarara–Kikagati Road passes through the western neighborhoods of the town in a general north to south direction.

See also
 List of cities and towns in Uganda

References

External links
Police Patrol Knocks Two Dead in Isingiro As of 8 August 2020.

Populated places in Western Region, Uganda
Cities in the Great Rift Valley
Isingiro District
Ankole sub-region